Sai Yok National Park is a national park in Sai Yok district, Kanchanaburi Province, Thailand. The park, home to mountains, waterfalls and caves, is part of the Western Forest Complex protected area.

Geography
The park's area is 312,500 rai ~ . The Khwae Noi river ("River Kwai") runs through the park. The western boundary of the park adjoins Myanmar.

Climate
The driest time of the year here is from December to February, while the rainiest time is from May to October.

History
Within the park are remains of a bridge on the Burma Railway and of a camp used by Japanese troops during World War II.

In 1978, the Russian roulette scenes of the film The Deer Hunter were filmed in the park. On 27 October 1980, Sai Yok became Thailand's 11th national park.

Attractions

The park's major attractions are its waterfalls, including Sai Yok Yai waterfall which flows into the Khwae Noi river. Sai Yok Yai Lek waterfall lies south of Sai Yok Yai along the Khwae Noi.

This cave complex consists of five large caverns, each containing large stalactites and stalagmites. Tham Daowadung consists of eight chambers of stalactites and stalagmites.

Flora and fauna
Sai Yok's forest is primarily teak forest. During the Japanese occupation of Thailand, teak trees were felled for use as railway sleepers on the Burma Railway. The teak forest was replanted in 1954. Other tree species include Shorea obtusa, Xylia xylocarpa, Bambusa bambos, Walsura robusta and Dialium cochinchinense.

Animal species include elephants, tiger, barking deer, sambar deer, wild pig, gibbon, Malayan porcupine, slow loris and serow. A species of crab—the Rachinee crab, coloured red, white and blue—was discovered in the park in 1983.

Sai Yok is home to Kitti's hog-nosed bat, a rare bat species considered to be the world's smallest mammal (weighing around 2 grams). The bat was first spotted in 1973 and is found only in some limestone caves of the park (including Tham Kang Kao) and surrounding areas in Kanchanaburi Province and nearby Myanmar.

See also
List of national parks of Thailand
List of Protected Areas Regional Offices of Thailand

References

National parks of Thailand
Geography of Kanchanaburi province
Tourist attractions in Kanchanaburi province
1980 establishments in Thailand
Protected areas established in 1980
Tenasserim Hills